Michael J. Marino (June 11, 1930 – March 6, 2011) was an American politician who served in the New Jersey General Assembly from the 32nd Legislative District from 1974 to 1976.

References

1930 births
2011 deaths
Democratic Party members of the New Jersey General Assembly
Politicians from Jersey City, New Jersey